Xenorhabdus budapestensis  is a bacterium from the genus of Xenorhabdus which has been isolated from the nematode Steinernema bicornutum in Subotica in Serbia. Xenorhabdus budapestensis produces bicornutin A2.

References

Further reading

External links
Type strain of Xenorhabdus budapestensis at BacDive -  the Bacterial Diversity Metadatabase	

Bacteria described in 2005